Safa Khaneh Rural District is in the Central District of Shahin Dezh County, West Azerbaijan province, Iran. At the National Census of 2006, its population was 7,970 in 1,575 households. There were 7,179 inhabitants in 1,659 households at the following census of 2011. At the most recent census of 2016, the population of the rural district was 6,245 in 1,804 households. The largest of its 24 villages was Quzluy-e Afshar, with 1,411 people.

References 

Shahin Dezh County

Rural Districts of West Azerbaijan Province

Populated places in West Azerbaijan Province

Populated places in Shahin Dezh County